Tommaso Allan (born 26 April 1993) is an Italian professional rugby union player who primarily plays fly-half for Harlequins of the English Premiership. He has also represented Italy at international level, having made his test debut against Australia during the 2013 Autumn Internationals. Allan has previously played for Perpignan and Benetton.

Club career 
Allan was part of the London Wasps Academy in 2011 before captaining the RGS High Wycombe rugby side. He won the Under-19 Provincial Championship while playing for Western Province in South Africa and at the end of his contract there, he joined Perpignan.

Allan signed for French Top 14 side Perpignan shortly before the 2013–14 season. Allan made his debut for Perpignan on 8 September 2013 against Racing Métro at Stade Olympique Yves-du-Manoir in the Hauts-de-Seine, Paris. Perpignan lost 19–16, with Allan kicking one conversion (56th minute) and kicking three penalties (3rd minute, 26th minute, 68th minute).

Because of Allan's end-of-year performances, he was called up to the national team. Allan played a total of eight games in the Top 14 and four in the Heineken Cup in his debut season for Perpignan, scoring a total of 27 points in 12 appearances for the side. Unfortunately Perpignan were relegated to the Pro D2 after finishing 13th out of the 14 teams.

In the 2014–15 Pro D2 season, Allan cemented a firm position on the number 10 role for Perpignan. Playing eighteen games, scoring three tries, fourteen penalty goals, scoring a total of 81 points and helping Perpignan to reach promotional play-offs.

Allan returned to his home region of Veneto, Italy, signing for Benetton Treviso before the 2016–17 Pro12 until 2020–21 Pro14 season. 

It was announced on 5 May 2021, that Allan had been signed by the English Premiership team Harlequins, to begin his career with them ahead of the 2021/22 season.

International career 
On 9 October 2013 Allan was named in the Italian 35-man training squad for the 2013 end-of-year rugby union tests, which led to the Scottish Rugby Union seeking clarity on Allan's intentions for his future. Despite Allan playing for Scotland at Under 17, Under 18 and Under 20 age groups, he was named in Jacques Brunel's final squad. He made his debut coming off the bench to score against Australia.

Allan started the first three of Italy's 2014 Six Nations matches against Wales, France and Scotland.

On 24 August 2015, he was named in the final 31-man squad for the 2015 Rugby World Cup and on 18 August 2019, he was named in the final 31-man squad for the 2019 Rugby World Cup.

Personal life 
Allan hails from a rugby family; his Scottish father William Allan and his Italian mother Paola Berlato both played in Italy, while his uncle John Allan earned 9 caps for Scotland and 13 for South Africa. Through his father he was eligible to represent Scotland, but chose to play for Italy at senior level. He went to the European School, Culham, England.

Statistics

List of international test tries 
As of 18 March 2023

References

External links 

1993 births
Living people
Alumni of the European Schools
Benetton Rugby players
Harlequin F.C. players
Italian rugby union players
Italian Scottish rugby union players
Italy international rugby union players
People educated at the Royal Grammar School, High Wycombe
Rugby union fly-halves
Scottish rugby union players
Sportspeople from Vicenza
USA Perpignan players